Yountville ( or ) is a city in Napa County, in the Wine Country of California, United States. Located in the North Bay region of the Bay Area, the population was 3,436 at the 2020 census. Almost a third of the town's population lives at the Veterans Home of California. Yountville is a popular tourist destination, particularly for its wineries and its two famed Michelin-starred restaurants, The French Laundry and Bouchon.

History

The town was named Sebastopol in 1855.

A town in nearby Sonoma County had already claimed that name (Sebastopol, California), and thus the town was renamed in 1867 to honor George C. Yount, following his death. Yount was considered responsible for establishing the first vineyard in the Napa Valley.

Geography
Yountville is located within Napa Valley, in the North Bay region of the San Francisco Bay Area of Northern California.

A 5.2 magnitude earthquake occurred in Yountville on September 3, 2000.

Climate

Demographics

2010
At the 2010 census Yountville had a population of 2,933. The racial makeup of Yountville was 2,623 (89.4%) White, 38 (1.3%) African American, 30 (1.0%) Native American, 49 (1.7%) Asian, 0 (0.0%) Pacific Islander, 92 (3.1%) from other races, and 101 (3.4%) from two or more races. Hispanic or Latino of any race were 289 people (9.9%).

The census reported that 1,945 people (66.3% of the population) lived in households, 60 (2.0%) lived in non-institutionalized group quarters, and 928 (31.6%) were institutionalized.

There were 1,050 households, 136 (13.0%) had children under the age of 18 living in them, 418 (39.8%) were opposite-sex married couples living together, 64 (6.1%) had a female householder with no husband present, 16 (1.5%) had a male householder with no wife present.  There were 48 (4.6%) unmarried opposite-sex partnerships, and 16 (1.5%) same-sex married couples or partnerships. 449 households (42.8%) were one person and 257 (24.5%) had someone living alone who was 65 or older. The average household size was 1.85.  There were 498 families (47.4% of households); the average family size was 2.53.

The age distribution was 237 people (8.1%) under the age of 18, 75 people (2.6%) aged 18 to 24, 426 people (14.5%) aged 25 to 44, 767 people (26.2%) aged 45 to 64, and 1,428 people (48.7%) who were 65 or older.  The median age was 64.0 years. For every 100 females, there were 136.3 males.  For every 100 females age 18 and over, there were 139.2 males.

There were 1,252 housing units at an average density of 817.6 per square mile, of the occupied units 688 (65.5%) were owner-occupied and 362 (34.5%) were rented. The homeowner vacancy rate was 4.2%; the rental vacancy rate was 5.2%.  1,266 people (43.2% of the population) lived in owner-occupied housing units and 679 people (23.2%) lived in rental housing units.

Economy
Major employers in Yountville include the Veterans Home of California and The Vintage Estate. Domaine Chandon California is located immediately outside city limits.

Arts and culture

Culinary scene
The French Laundry, founded by Sally Schmitt in 1978 and now owned by chef Thomas Keller, has a three-star Michelin Guide rating, and was twice named the "best restaurant in the world" by "The Worlds 50 Best" restaurant rating organization. Yountville is also the home of a Michelin one-star restaurant, Bouchon. With more than one Michelin star per 1,000 residents, Yountville claims the most Michelin stars per capita of anywhere in North America.

Attractions
 Bespoke Collection
 Napa Valley Museum
 Lincoln Theatre
 The Yountville American Viticultural Area
 Veterans Memorial Grove Cemetery (also known as the California State Veterans Home Cemetery)
 George C. Yount Pioneer Cemetery
 Vine Trail Bike Path

Government

The Town of Yountville has a council–manager form of government. The mayor is John F. Dunbar.

See also
 Yountville shooting
 Napa City-County Library
 Yountville Hills

References

External links

 
 Yountville Chamber of Commerce website

 
Cities in Napa County, California
Napa Valley
California wine
Cities in the San Francisco Bay Area
Incorporated cities and towns in California